Vitalijus Satkevičius (born March 25, 1961) is a Lithuanian politician and the current mayor of Panevėžys since 2011.

In 1988 he graduated from Kaunas Politechnical Institute. Vitalijus has been a member of the Panevėžys city council since 1997 and served as the mayor from 2008 to 2011 and since 2011.

Satkevičius is a devout Catholic and has been a member of the Society of Living Rosary since 1971.

References 

Mayors of places in Lithuania
People from Panevėžys
Lithuanian Roman Catholics
1961 births
Living people
Lithuanian municipal councillors
Kaunas University of Technology alumni